Ram Niwas Garden is a garden situated in Jaipur city in Indian state of Rajasthan, built by Maharaja Sawai Ram Singh of Jaipur in 1868.

Overview

Apart from that it also has a bird park, the Zoo, Ravindra Rang Manch Theatre, art gallery, exhibition ground, gymnasium and several cafes and picnic spots are housed in the garden.

References 

Gardens in Rajasthan
Tourist attractions in Jaipur
1868 establishments in India
Parks in Jaipur